The Rustic Inn is a restaurant in Fort Lauderdale, Florida in the United States. It was established in 1955 by Henry Oreal and his brother-in-law Burton Wayne McDonald.

The restaurant features waterfront dining on a dock. It also has a barge, cocktail lounge, and dining room.

Notes

External links
Rustic Inn Crabhouse

Restaurants in Florida
Restaurants established in 1955
1955 establishments in Florida
Fort Lauderdale, Florida